Marilyn Giuliano (born July 14, 1953 in Wallingford, Connecticut) is a member of the Connecticut House of Representatives.

She graduated from Southern Connecticut State University.

Career
Giuliano was first elected to the House of Representatives in 2002. She is a Republican.

References

People from Wallingford, Connecticut
Republican Party members of the Connecticut House of Representatives
Women state legislators in Connecticut
Southern Connecticut State University alumni
1953 births
Living people
21st-century American women